Nancy Yi Fan (born August 26, 1993 ) is a Chinese American author who is best known for writing a series that currently consists of the novels Swordbird, Sword Quest, and Sword Mountain.

Biography
Fan was born in Beijing, China. At the age of 7, she moved with her parents to Syracuse, New York. She started writing her first novel 3 years later, and completed the manuscript within a year. Fan's book became a New York Times Bestseller, and she was featured on The Oprah Winfrey Show as one of the world's smartest kids. She then began writing Sword Quest, a prequel to Swordbird, and published it two years later. Her third book, Sword Mountain, was released in July 2012.

Career

Swordbird
Fan's novel was inspired by her lifelong love for birds. After awaking from a vivid dream about birds at war while simultaneously wrestling with her feelings about terrorism and the September 11th Attacks, Fan wrote Swordbird as a way to convey a message of peace to the world. At the age of eleven, Fan began writing a manuscript for her story, which she finished a year later. She emailed her manuscript to the CEO of HarperCollins, which led to the novel's 50,000-copy first printing.

Sword Quest
In 2008, HarperCollins released Sword Quest, a prequel set 100 years before the time of Swordbird.

Sword Mountain
The third novel in Fan's series was set to be released in July 2012, by HarperCollins. Everybird must choose a side as tradition begins to splinter and an ancient book bewitches those with evil intentions.

Personal life
In 2011, Fan began attending Harvard University. In her free time, she enjoys practicing Martial Arts and takes care of her two pet birds.

See also
 Christopher Paolini

References

External links

American writers of Chinese descent
1993 births
Living people
Chinese emigrants to the United States
American child writers
American women writers
Writers from Florida
Writers from Beijing
Eastside High School (Gainesville, Florida) alumni
Harvard University alumni
21st-century American women